The following are lists of all Commonwealth Games venues, starting with the first Commonwealth Games in 1930, alphabetically, by sport and by year.

As a multi-sport event, competitions held during a given the Commonwealth Games usually take placed in venue across the host city and its metropolitan area. Some Commonwealth competitions may be held outside the host metropolitan area, and in other regions of the host country.

One venue is designated as the big centrepiece stadium of the games. Traditionally as at the Summer Olympic Games, the opening and closing ceremonies and the Athletics competitions are held in this Stadium.

There were also 3 Commonwealth Winter Games held in St Moritz 2 years after the summer Commonwealth Games, and 4 Commonwealth Paraplegic Games held immediately before and after the summer Commonwealth Games. Both events have now been discontinued, but since 2002 athletes with a disability have competed as full members of their nation teams at the Commonwealth Games.

Commonwealth Games

Youth games

Commonwealth Paraplegic Games

Commonwealth Winter Games

See also

List of Olympic venues
List of stadiums in Canada

References

External links

 
Lists of sports venues
 
Venues